Augustinerkirche (German for "Augustinian Church", after the Augustinian Order) may refer to the following churches:

 Augustinian Church, Vienna in Vienna, Austria
 Augustinerkirche (Munich) in Munich, Germany
 Augustinerkirche Zürich in Zürich, Switzerland